Izumi Records is an independent record label based in Brighton, England.  It was founded by record producer Dave Lynch.  Originally a vinyl-only label, Izumi was one of the first record labels to include artist-specific comic books with its releases.

Artists
Betchadupa
Burning Codes
Channel In Channel Out
Duke Special
Federico Durand
Foreign Slippers
The Ghears
Iain Archer
Ingo Star Cruiser
Jason Kent
Keegan DeWitt
The Late Greats
The Mummers
Sketches For Albinos
Swimming (band)
We Show Up On Radar

External links
 

British record labels
Companies based in East Sussex